Giorgos Muzakis  (Athens, 15 August 1922 – 27 August 2005) was a prominent Greek virtuoso trumpeter and music composer.

Career
Born in Metaxourgeio, Mouzakis performed first as a trumpeter in 1938, recording his first album in 1946.  He studied at the Athens Conservatoire (1939–1947) and continued his education in Austria and Germany (1952–1954). Many of his compositions were for the theater.

A productive composer with influences from tango, bolero and bossa nova tunes, Mouzakis' opus consists of some 2,500 tunes and songs for over 200 plays, 20 musical comedies, and about 60 films. His best-known compositions are: "The Slave Woman" (Η Σκλάβα), "My Weakness" (Αδυναμία μου), "A friend from the past" (Ένας φίλος ήρθε από τα παλιά) "I whistle to you" (Σου σφυρίζω), "The Hymn of Panathinaikos" (ο Ύμνος του Παναθηναϊκού) and many more.

He was a member of the Greek Composers' Society and National Music Association and performed widely in Greece and abroad including America, Australia, Bulgaria, Canada, Poland and Romania. A resident of Athens, Mouzakis received a presidential distinction in 2003.

References

Who's Who 1979 p. 434

1922 births
2005 deaths
Musicians from Athens
Greek musicians
Greek songwriters
Greek film score composers
Male film score composers
Greek trumpeters
Panathinaikos A.O.
Panathinaikos F.C.
20th-century trumpeters
20th-century male musicians